Claremont was an electoral district of the Legislative Assembly in the Australian state of Western Australia from 1901 to 1968.

Located in the affluent western suburbs of Perth, it was a safe seat for the Liberal Party and its predecessor parties. At its abolition it included Claremont, Mount Claremont, Swanbourne and the western part of Dalkeith.

It was abolished at the 1968 state election, with its area mostly transferring to Nedlands, and smaller parts to Electoral district of Cottesloe and the new district of Floreat.

Claremont's most notable member was Charles North, who served as Speaker from 1947 until 1953 during the McLarty–Watts Ministry.

Members for Claremont

Election results

Claremont
1901 establishments in Australia
Constituencies established in 1901
1968 disestablishments in Australia
Constituencies disestablished in 1968